Montélimar Agglomération is the communauté d'agglomération, an intercommunal structure, centred on the city of Montélimar. It is located in the Drôme department, in the Auvergne-Rhône-Alpes region, southeastern France. Created in 2014, its seat is in Montélimar. Its area is 381.2 km2. Its population was 67,520 in 2019, of which 39,818 in Montélimar proper.

Composition
The communauté d'agglomération consists of the following 27 communes:

Allan
Ancône
La Bâtie-Rolland
Bonlieu-sur-Roubion
Charols
Châteauneuf-du-Rhône
Cléon-d'Andran
Condillac
La Coucourde
Espeluche
La Laupie
Manas
Marsanne
Montboucher-sur-Jabron
Montélimar
Portes-en-Valdaine
Puygiron
Puy-Saint-Martin
Rochefort-en-Valdaine
Roynac
Saint-Gervais-sur-Roubion
Saint-Marcel-lès-Sauzet
Saulce-sur-Rhône
Sauzet
Savasse
La Touche
Les Tourrettes

References

Montelimar
Montelimar